Garret Linn (born 1967) is an American experimental and documentary filmmaker. His films revolve around ideas of memory, travel and the representation of forgetting.

He is known for the feature length jazz concert film John Lurie and the Lounge Lizards Live in Berlin 1991 and the experimental feature film automobilux.

He also has worked with contemporary artists including; Martin Beck, Micheal Joo, Kyong Park founder of Storefront for Art and Architecture, Marjetica Potrč, Tavares Strachan, Jacques Jarrige and Gordon Kipping.

Filmography
 2019 Jacques Jarrige: or how I lost my blind faith in unreliable narrators
 2016 C-Twon: Excerpt (short film)
 2015 Oro Dulce as co-producer with Francisca Benítez
 2007 automobilux
 1992 John Lurie and the Lounge Lizards Live in Berlin 1991

References

External links
 

1967 births
Living people
American film directors
American experimental filmmakers